Islambayevo (İslambay) is a rural locality (a village) in Askarovsky Selsoviet, Burzyansky District, Bashkortostan, Russia. The population was 359 as of 2010. There are 5 streets.

Geography 
Islambayevo is located 42 km north of Starosubkhangulovo (the district's administrative centre) by road. Askarovo is the nearest rural locality.

References 

Rural localities in Burzyansky District